NAC Air was a Canadian regional airline that began operations in 2000. Its main base was at the Thunder Bay International Airport. NAC Air was a 100% First Nations-owned company, owned  by the communities of Eabametoong (Fort Hope), Neskantaga (Lansdowne House), Webequie, Sachigo Lake, and Sandy Lake

NAC Air ceased operations indefinitely in early 2008 due to financial difficulties.

History 

North American Charters (NAC) was established in 2000 to provide cheaper and more frequent airline services to First Nations communities in Northwestern Ontario. NAC's airfares were 40-50% lower than its competitors' existing fares and it also offered daily services with the possibility of same-day returns for business travellers. It commenced services with two Piper PA31-350 Chieftains and quickly added a Fairchild SA226-TC Metro II as well. The two Chieftains were soon replaced by the first Pilatus PC-12s and the Metro was also retired at the end of 2001. NAC grew steadily, evolving from the early two aircraft operation serving four communities to an eleven aircraft operation connecting Sioux Lookout, Ontario; Winnipeg; Thunder Bay; Red Lake, Ontario; Thompson, Manitoba and 21 First Nations communities. In 2006 NAC changed its name to NAC Air, this coincided with the company moving into a new three-storey office and hangar complex at the Thunder Bay International Airport. In 2007 a base was opened in Winnipeg, Manitoba, it serviced 2 aircraft which flew out of Winnipeg and 1 which flew out of Thompson, Manitoba.

On 13 January 2008 NAC Air ceased operations indefinitely due to financial difficulties, they claim, stemmed from a lawsuit with rival Wasaya Airways. The shut down forced 150 employees off the job.

Service Communities 

 Brochet
 Bearskin Lake
 Big Trout Lake
 Deer Lake
 Fort Hope
 Gods Lake Narrows
 Gods River
 Kasabonika
 Lac Brochet
 Muskrat Dam
 Neskantaga
 Norway House
 Oxford House
 Pikangikum
 Red Lake
 Round Lake
 Sachigo Lake
 Sandy Lake
 Shamattawa
 Sioux Lookout
 Summer Beaver
 Tadoule Lake
 Thompson
 Thunder Bay
 Webequie
 Winnipeg

Fleet 
As of November 2007, NAC Air had a fleet of 11 aircraft.

 2 Beechcraft 100 King Air
 1 Beechcraft A100 King Air
 8 Pilatus PC-12/45

See also 
 List of defunct airlines of Canada

References

External links 
 NAC Air official website

Defunct airlines of Canada
Companies based in Thunder Bay
Airlines established in 2000
Airlines disestablished in 2008